Hawks of Thrace (HoT) is a possibly defunct, anti-Turkish, pro-Kurdish independence Greek terrorist organization based in Thrace, Greece.

The HoT attacked the Turkish consulate-general in Komotini on 8 February 1999 in support of Kurdistan Workers' Party (PKK) leader Abdullah Öcalan. This was the only attack this group has ever made. HoT attacked the Turkish-Greek population in Thrace throughout the 1990s, particularly politicians running for office in the Greek government.

References

Left-wing militant groups in Greece
Terrorism in Greece
Western Thrace
1999 in Greece